The North Thompson Street Historic District encompasses a collection of six International Style commercial buildings on North Thompson Street, between Monument Avenue and Broad Street, in Richmond, Virginia, United States.  All are built of steel, brick, and concrete, and feature expanses of glass and asymmetrical plans.  They were built between 1955 and 1959, as part of a buffer zone of "quiet commerce" between the Beltline Expressway on one side and the residential area on the other.

The district was listed on the National Register of Historic Places in 2017.

See also
National Register of Historic Places listings in Richmond, Virginia

References

Historic districts on the National Register of Historic Places in Virginia
National Register of Historic Places in Richmond, Virginia